Callinicus II (1630 – 8 August 1702) was Ecumenical Patriarch of Constantinople for three terms (1688, 1689–93, 1694–1702).

References

External links

Οικουμενικό Πατριαρχείο
Εγκυκλοπαίδεια Μείζονος Ελληνισμού
Konstantinos Sathas, Βιογραφίαι των εν τοις γράμμασι διαλαμψάντων Ελλήνων από της καταλύσεως της Βυζαντινής Αυτοκρατορίας μέχρι της Ελληνικής Εθνεγερσίας 1453–1821, εκδ. Κουλτούρα,1990, pp. 352–356

1630 births
1702 deaths
Metropolitans of Bursa
17th-century Ecumenical Patriarchs of Constantinople
18th-century Ecumenical Patriarchs of Constantinople